Ramón Lage (born 9 June 1973 in Oviedo, Asturias, Spain) is a Spanish musician, best known for his work as vocalist of power/progressive metal band Avalanch.

Career 

Lage started his musical career in the 90's with the band Arkaes as lead singer and guitarist. Later, he was recruited as a singer for the band Paco Jones with which he recorded the album "Invisible" in 1999. In early 2002 he became the lead vocalist of Avalanch, having already worked with them in the past as a roadie and background vocalist. Ramón showed an interest in singing from a very early age, but professionally started when he joined Avalanch, which led him to perform multiple tours in Spain and all around the world. In parallel, Lage also lent his voice to the bands Stunned Parrots and Geysser, working in both side projects alongside former bandmate Alberto Rionda.

His voice has often been described as greatly versatile, easily able to switch "from an aggressive sound to some very calm and very pleasant singing"

In 2006, he was the first vocalist ever to receive one of the official Asturian Music Awards, by winning in the category of Best Singer in the first edition of the AMAS Awards.

In 2011, he worked as a vocal coach at Derrame Rock School in Oviedo, Asturias.

Avalanch entered an indefinite hiatus on 2012 after performing two farewell shows in Mexico supporting Scorpions.

In February 2013, he was announced as the new vocalist and guitarist for Human, an Asturian thrash metal band he had previously collaborated with.

The following years the band went through some line up changes, and then focused on working on their third studio album; the first one with Lage as a frontman and songwriter.

After a long silence, in 2016 Human announced the return of their original line up for a farewell tour in Asturias and then disbanded.

In December 2016, Avalanch's leader Alberto Rionda unilaterally announced a comeback with a completely new line up. Shortly after, in February 2017, all the rest of musicians from the previous line up, including Lage, signed an official statement confirming they had not taken part in any decision regarding the band's return.

Discography

With Paco Jones

Studio albums 
 Invisible (2000)

With Avalanch

Studio albums 
 Los poetas han muerto (2003)
 El hijo pródigo (2005)
 Muerte y vida (2007)
 El ladrón de sueños (2010)
 Malefic Time: Apocalypse (2011)

English versions/Re-recorded albums/Compilations 
 Las ruinas del Edén (2004) –  Re-recorded old songs.
 Mother Earth (2005) – English version of Los Poetas Han Muerto
 Un paso más (2005) – Greatest hits. 
 Del Cielo a La Tierra (2012) – Greatest hits.

DVD/Live Albums 
 Cien Veces (2005) 
 Lágrimas Negras (DVD) – (2006) 
 Caminar sobre el agua (2CD+DVD) – (2008)

Singles 
 Lucero (2003)
 Las ruinas del Edén (2004) 
 Where The Streets Have No Name (2004) – U2 cover
 Alas de cristal (2005)
 Mil motivos (2010)
 Malefic Time: Apocalypse (2012)

With Stunned Parrots

Studio albums 
 Vol. 1 - Pining for the Fjords (2006)

With Geysser

Studio albums 
 El hombre sin talento (2010)

With Human

Demos 
 All Together (2013)
 No More (2014) 
 We Are One (2014)

Guest Appearances

References

External links 
 Avalanch's official website
 Ramón Lage's semi-official Facebook page
 Geysser on Myspace

Living people
Heavy metal singers
Spanish guitarists
Singers from Asturias
21st-century Spanish singers
1973 births
People from Oviedo
Spanish rock singers
Rock en Español musicians
Avalanch members
21st-century Spanish male singers
Spanish male guitarists